M-CABI (Stylized as m-CABI) is the sixth studio album by the Japanese pop-rock band Porno Graffitti. It was released on November 22, 2006.

Track listing

References

2006 albums
Porno Graffitti albums
Japanese-language albums
Sony Music albums